St. Dominic's Church, Church of St. Dominick, and variations, may refer to:

England
 St Dominic's Priory Church, Camden, London NW5
 St Dominic's Church, Newcastle

United States
 St. Dominic Church in San Francisco, California
 St. Dominic's Church (Denver, Colorado), listed on the NRHP in Colorado
 St. Dominic Catholic Church (Miami, FL), Florida
 St. Dominic's Catholic Church, in Springfield, Kentucky, listed on the NRHP in Kentucky
 St. Dominic's Church (Portland, Maine)
 St. Dominic's Church (Bronx), New York City
 St. Dominic Roman Catholic Church (Oyster Bay, New York), in Oyster Bay, New York
 St. Dominic Catholic Church (Washington, D.C.)

Other places
 Saint-Dominique Church (Quebec City), Canada
 Basilica of Saint Dominic, Bologna, Italy
 St. Dominic's Church, Macau
 Basilica of St Dominic, Valletta, Malta
 St. Dominic's Church, Bahawalpur, Pakistan
 St. Dominic Parish Church, in Santo Domingo, Nueva Ecija, Philippines

See also
St. Dominic's Cathedral (disambiguation)